Gerundo Lake was a lake between the Province of Bergamo, Province of Milano, Province of Lodi and Province of Cremona, in Lombardy, Italy. The Romans originally built drainage channels through it for agricultural purposes. By the 13th century, nothing remained of the lake but fertile plains. It was approximately 50 by 25 kilometers in size and is now completely drained.

Legend

Gerundo Lake was rumoured to be home to Tarantasio, a great dragon who ruled the lake.

References

Lakes of Lombardy
Former lakes of Italy